Amelia Natasha, more commonly known as Ata (born 29 May 1979), is an Indonesian television presenter.

Ata was born in Jakarta, Indonesia. She was a host of the popular TV show Indonesian Idol for its first four seasons, from 2004–2007.

She also hosted the first Asian Idol contest, held in Indonesia, won by Hady Mirza of Singapore Idol.

References

External links

1979 births
Living people
People from Jakarta
Indonesian people of Chinese descent
Indonesian Idol
Indonesian television personalities
Indonesian television presenters
Indonesian women television presenters